Sister Mary Ursula Grachan (born Alma Veronica Grachan; 17 September 1901  17 July 1992) was Professed as a Sister of the Presentation of the Blessed Virgin Mary in 1925. She was the first woman to receive a Diploma of Education at the University of Tasmania.

Sister Ursula was born at Beaconsfield, Tasmania. She worked as a dedicated teacher in Presentation schools at Launceston and Hobart. In 1981 she received the Order of Australia Medal for “service to education”.

Sister Mary Ursula Grachan died on 17 July 1992 at Launceston, Tasmania.

Early years 
Alma Grachan was the eldest of five children born to a miner William Grachan and Emily Ross. While in the Primary School at Beaconsfield she showed spiritual and academic potential and which Mother Gertrude O’Sullivan noticed and hence arranged that she attend boarding school at Sacred Heart College in Launceston.

After completing her secondary school education Alma taught with the Tasmanian Department of Education for some years. Employed as student teacher: St Mary's Kindergarten, Hobart (1919-1920),  St Mary's College (1920), Cressy State School, Wellington Square Infant School (1922).

Alma was 21 when she entered Launceston convent on 13 August 1922, when she was given the name Ursula.

Religious life 
She entered religious life in 1922 and took her first vows three years later. Sr Ursula was highly qualified with university honours in education and music.

Studying relentlessly to gain university degrees and musical qualifications so that she could more ably assist her students. She was the first woman to receive a Diploma of Education at the University of Tasmania. Arts degree in English, Latin, Psychology, Mathematics. In music she achieved an Associate of Music, Australia (A.Mus.A [Performer]) and a Licentiate of Music (A.Mus.A. [Teacher]).

Sister Ursula also taught Music before and after school hours, in this way, no doubt, contributing to the meagre income of the Sisters.

When Home Science was introduced in the school she was able to share her giftedness in dressmaking, needlework, spinning, weaving, pottery, painting and other crafts becoming renowned as a “brilliant teacher”. She was also exhibited at the Launceston Show over many years gaining a host of awards in the sewing, knitting and handicraft sections.

Most of her life was spent in Launceston, where she taught at the Sacred Heart College. She taught for 12 years in Hobart and was Head of St Mary's College there for three years.

In 1981 she received the Order of Australia Medal for “service to education”. The Queen personally awarded her with the Order of Australia at Albert Hall in Launceston for contribution to music and education.

In the post-Second Vatican Council years she found change difficult and choosing to retain the former practices and the traditional habit. Sister Mary Ursula Grachan died on 17 July 1992 at Launceston, Tasmania.

References 

1901 births
1992 deaths
20th-century Australian Roman Catholic nuns
Recipients of the Medal of the Order of Australia
Presentation Sisters